Ostad Shariar Metro Station is a station on Tabriz Metro Line 1. The station opened on 27 August 2015. It is located on Shahriar Expressway at Mehranrud River shore next to Baghlar Baghi Garden.  The next eastern station is 29 Bahman Metro Station and the next western station is Daneshgah Metro station.

References

Tabriz Metro stations